Lied Place Residences is a residential development in Lincoln, Nebraska, US.

History 
The project is situated on the site of a former Applebee's restaurant which closed in December 2013.

In September 2019, a groundbreaking ceremony was held. At this time, the project was expected to be completed by spring 2021.

Residents began moving in during February 2022.

References 

Buildings and structures in Lincoln, Nebraska
Buildings and structures completed in 2022